Would You Believe It! is a 1929 British silent comedy film directed by Walter Forde and starring Forde, Pauline Johnson and Arthur Stratton. It was made at the Nettlefold Studios in Walton-on-Thames and released as a supporting feature. It was later re-released with added sound effects and music. A British inventor develops a new high-tech tank and is pursued by foreign agents who wish to capture the design.

Cast
 Walter Forde as Walter
 Pauline Johnson as Pauline
 Arthur Stratton as Cuthbert
 Albert Brouett as Spy
 Anita O'Day as Farmer's wife
 Anita Sharp-Bolster as Presbyterian
 Sidney Gilliat as Restaurant customer
 Ian Wilson as Restaurant customer

References

Bibliography
 Chibnall, Steve. Quota Quickies: The Birth of the British 'B' film. British Film Institute, 2007.
 Low, Rachael. History of the British Film, 1918-1929. George Allen & Unwin, 1971.
 Wood, Linda. British Films, 1927-1939. British Film Institute, 1986.

External links

1929 films
1920s spy comedy films
British spy comedy films
British silent feature films
Films shot at Nettlefold Studios
Films directed by Walter Forde
Transitional sound comedy films
Films set in England
British black-and-white films
Butcher's Film Service films
1929 comedy films
1920s English-language films
1920s British films
Silent comedy films